Manuel Alexandre Nana Bikoula (born January 17, 1980) is a Cameroonian football player. He was born in Yaounde.

Club career

 Shooting Stars of Limbe (Cameroon) 1999–2000
 Tonnerre Yaoundé (Cameroon) 2000–2002 
 Coton Sport FC de Garoua (Cameroon) 2002–2004
 Troyes AC, (France) 2004–2005 
 KS Besa Kavajë (Albania) 2005–2012
 Thonburi-BG United (Thailand) 2012–2014

Honours
 Best player in 2nd Division in Cameroon
 Best scorer in Cameroon 1st Division
 CAF winning runner 2002
 CAF winning runner 2003

References

External links
 

1980 births
Living people
Footballers from Yaoundé
Cameroonian footballers
Association football midfielders
Besa Kavajë players
Cameroon under-20 international footballers
Cameroon international footballers